Valeriu Vlas (born 6 August 1971 in Călărași) is a retired Moldovan long-distance runner who specialized in the marathon. His personal best time is 2:17:32 hours.

His career highlight was a 35th place at the 1999 World Championships. He also competed at the Olympic Games in 1996 and 2000 without reaching the final.

Achievements

References
sports-reference

1971 births
Living people
People from Călărași District
Moldovan male marathon runners
Athletes (track and field) at the 1996 Summer Olympics
Athletes (track and field) at the 2000 Summer Olympics
Olympic athletes of Moldova
World Athletics Championships athletes for Moldova